The 2018 Munster Senior Hurling League, known for sponsorship reasons as the Co-Op Superstores Munster Hurling League, was the third Munster Senior Hurling League, an annual hurling league competition for county teams from the province of Munster. The league began on 30 December 2017 and ended on 14 January 2018.

Cork were the defending champions. Tipperary and Waterford did not participate in the league.

On 14 January 2018, Limerick won the league title following a 0-16 to 0-10 defeat of Clare. It was their first Munster SHL title.

Format

Each team plays each other team once, earning 2 points for a win and 1 for a draw. The top two teams advance to the final.

Results

Table

{| class="wikitable" 
!width=20|
!width=150 style="text-align:left;"|Team
!width=20|
!width=20|
!width=20|
!width=20|
!width=30|
!width=50|
!width=20|
!width=20|
|- style="background:#D0F0C0;" 
|1||align=left| Clare ||2||2||0||0||8-37||0-30||31||4
|- style="background:#D0F0C0;"
|2||align=left| Limerick ||2||2||0||0||5-42||2-36||15||4
|-
|3||align=left| Kerry ||3||1||0||2||2-50||8-52||–20||2
|-
|4||align=left| Cork ||3||0||0||3||2-52||7-63||–25||0
|}

Round 1

Round 2

Round 3

The final group game was cancelled, as Limerick and Clare had already reached the final.

Final

League statistics

Top scorers

Top scorers overall

Top scorers in a single game

Miscellaneous
 Kerry's 1-23 to 1-13 defeat of Cork was their first competitive senior victory over their neighbours since the 1891 Munster Championship.

References

Munster Senior Hurling League
Munster Senior Hurling League